Luu Ngoc Mai (born 10 May 1974) is a former Vietnamese footballer.

Personal life
She was born on May 10, 1974, in Ho Chi Minh City, Vietnam. She is the youngest child in a family of 13 siblings. She belongs to the first generation of Ho Chi Minh City women's football. At Vietnamese Golden Ball 2001, Luu Ngoc Mai went down in history as the only female player to be awarded the Bronze Ball together with male players. After winning the gold medal with the Vietnamese women's football team SEA Games 2003, she decided to retire at the age of 30.

International goals

Achievements 
Club:
Champion Vietnamese Women's Football Championship 2002
National team
Gold medal in women's football SEA Games 2001, SEA Games 2003
Bronze medal of women's football SEA Games 1997
Individual
 Women's Golden Ball 2001
 Women's Silver Ball 2003
 2001 Bronze Ball (for both male and female players)
 Top scorer Vietnamese Women's Football Championship 1999 (with Nguyen Khoa Dieu Sinh (Hanoi))
 Top scorer Vietnamese Women's Football Championship 2001 (with Nguyen Thi Ha (Hanoi))
 Top scorer Vietnamese Women's Football Championship 2002
 Top scorer SEA Games 2001 with 7 goals.
 Top scorer SEA Games 2003 with 4 goals.

References

1974 births
Living people
Vietnamese women's footballers
Vietnam women's international footballers
Competitors at the 2001 Southeast Asian Games
Competitors at the 2003 Southeast Asian Games
Asian Games competitors for Vietnam
21st-century Vietnamese women
Southeast Asian Games competitors for Vietnam
Women's association footballers not categorized by position